Portrait of a University 1851–1951; to commemorate the centenary of Manchester University is a book written by H. B. Charlton to celebrate the 100 year anniversary of the founding of Owens College, and published by Manchester University Press. At the time of writing Henry Buckley Charlton (born 1890) had been John Edward Taylor Professor of English Literature since 1921. It includes a chapter by Samuel Alexander and an essay by Edward Fiddes on the admission of women to full university status.

References

1951 non-fiction books
University of Manchester